is a 2011 Japanese anime action fantasy film based on Masashi Kishimoto's manga and anime series. It was released in Japan on July 27, 2011, in North America on February 18, 2014 and in Indonesia on April 19, 2015. Neon Alley began streaming the anime film on January 26, 2014. The theme song "Otakebi" is performed by Yusuke Kamiji. The film is set after episode 196.

Plot
, the head of the prison, places the  seal on Naruto and limits his chakra. , a Hidden Grass Black Ops member, tells him that Mui used Hot Water villager Kazan to frame Naruto, and Mui's son  was sacrificed and sealed into the Box of Paradise ten years ago. During the prison riot, Mui uses Naruto's fox chakra to unlock the box, only for the resurrected Muku to be possessed by the demon  and invade the castle. Naruto and his friends fail to defeat Satori, but the dying Mui seals it within Muku with the formula and the victim returns to the box. As the group recapture the survived prisoners, Ryūzetsu dies using Dragon Life Reincarnation to save Naruto. The heroes then interred her and Mui, and place the sealed box at sea. Tsunade informs the team that Naruto's false arrest was rehearsed. Naruto then ties Ryūzetsu's bandanna around her gravestone, promising to cherish the life she returned to him, and re-quoting what she said about being a guiding light by protecting the things people cherish.

Voice cast

Home media
The film was released on DVD on April 25, 2012.

References

External links
 
 
 

2011 films
2011 anime films
2010s prison films
2010s Japanese-language films
Films directed by Masahiko Murata
Japanese sequel films
Blood Prison
Japanese prison films
Toho animated films
Viz Media anime
Films scored by Yasuharu Takanashi